= G. Teilherber =

Indonesian footballer

Teilherber
Personal information
- Place of birth: Dutch East Indies
- Position: Forward

Senior career*
Years	Team	Apps	(Gls)
- Djocoja Djokjakarta

International career
- Dutch East Indies
- * Club domestic league appearances and goals

G. Teilherber was an Indonesian football forward who played for the Dutch East Indies in the 1938 FIFA World Cup. He also played for Djocoja Djokjakarta. Teilherber is deceased.
